The 2012 LSU Tigers football team represented Louisiana State University in the 2012 NCAA Division I FBS football season. The Tigers were led by eighth-year head coach Les Miles and played their home games at Tiger Stadium. They were a member of the Western Division of the Southeastern Conference. They finished the season 10–3, 6–2 in SEC play to finish in a tie for second place in the West Division. They were invited to the Chick-fil-A Bowl where they were defeated by Clemson.

Personnel

Coaching staff

Recruits

Schedule

Schedule Sources:

Roster

Rankings

References

LSU
LSU Tigers football seasons
LSU Tigers football